Harry Foote Hodges (February 25, 1860 – September 24, 1929) was a United States Army officer in the late 19th and early 20th centuries. He served in the Spanish–American War and World War I, and he received the Distinguished Service Medal.

Biography
Hodges was born in Boston on February 25, 1860. He attended school at Boston Latin School and Adams Academy in Quincy, Massachusetts, and he graduated from the United States Military Academy in 1881.

Hodges was commissioned into the United States Army Corps of Engineers and served in various positions, including river and harbor duty and teaching at USMA. He was a lieutenant colonel of the First U.S. Volunteer Engineers starting on June 10, 1898, and he served in Puerto Rico during the Spanish–American War. Hodges served as Chief Engineer of the Department of Cuba from 1901 to 1902. He worked at the Office of the Chief of Engineers in Washington, D.C., from 1902 to 1907and he served as General Purchasing Officer, assistant chief engineer, and as a member of the Isthmian Canal Commission from 1907 to 1914. Hodges was in charge of the designing the dams, locks, and regulation works of the Panama Canal from 1914 to 1915, and he served as an engineer of maintenance. For his efforts, he received thanks from Congress, and he was promoted to the rank of brigadier general on March 4, 1915.

Hodges commanded the North and Middle Atlantic Coast Artillery Districts from 1915 to 1917, and he commanded the 76th Infantry Division at Camp Devens and in France from August 25, 1917, to January 1, 1919. He received the Army Distinguished Service Medal for this latter command. The citation for the medal reads:

Hodges then commanded the 20th Division at Camp Sevier, South Carolina, and Camp Travis, Texas, from January 1 to July 1, 1919. From July 1, 1919 to December 21, 1921, he commanded the North Pacific and Third Coast Artillery Districts. Hodges was promoted to the rank of major general on December 21, 1921, and he retired the following day.

Hodges lived in retirement in Lake Forest, Illinois. He died in Chicago on September 24, 1929.

Personal life
Hodges married Alma L'Hommedieu Raynolds on December 8, 1887, and they had four children together. He was an Episcopalian.

Legacy
The USS General H. F. Hodges (AP-144), a World War II Naval ship, was named after Hodges.

References

Bibliography

1860 births
1929 deaths
People from Boston
People from Lake Forest, Illinois
United States Army generals of World War I
United States Army generals
United States Army Corps of Engineers personnel
Recipients of the Distinguished Service Medal (US Army)
United States Military Academy alumni
Military personnel from Illinois
Military personnel from Massachusetts